The 7th district of the Iowa Senate is located in Northwestern Iowa; it is currently composed of part of Woodbury County. Its current member of the Iowa Senate is Democrat Jackie Smith.

Current elected officials
Jackie Smith is the senator currently representing the 7th District.

The area of the 7th District contains two Iowa House of Representatives districts:
The 13th District (represented by Chris Hall)
The 14th District (represented by Steve Hansen)

The district is also located in Iowa's 4th congressional district, which is represented by U.S. Representative Randy Feenstra.

Past senators
The district has previously been represented by:

Alvin Saunders, 1856–59
Harvey W. English, 1860–63
L. W. Hillyer, 1864–67
Isaac W. Keller, 1868–71
Elisha T. Smith, 1872–75
Frederick Joseph Teale, 1876–77
Philip W. Lewellen, 1878–81
Talton E. Clark, 1882–89
George W. Perkins, 1890–93
William Eaton, 1894–1901
Lester W. Lewis, 1902–07
William D. Jamison, 1907–10
John J. Dunnegan, 1911–14
Herbert I. Foskett, 1915–22
Sylvester C. Rees, 1923–26
Denver L. Wilson, 1927–30
Frank I. Coykendall, 1931–34
Paul L. Millhone, 1935–38
Carl O. Sjulin, 1939–46
Earl C. Fishbaugh, Jr., 1947–54
Frank Hoxie, 1955–62
Robert R. Dodds, 1963–70
Floyd Gilley, 1971–72
Ralph F. McCartney, 1973–74
Milo Merrit, 1975–78
Arthur L. Gratias, 1979–82
C. Joseph Coleman, 1983–90
James B. Kersten, 1991–94
Rod N. Halvorson, 1995–98
Mike Sexton, 1999–2002
Amanda Ragan, 2003–12
Rick Bertrand, 2013–18
Jackie Smith, 2019–present

See also
Iowa General Assembly
Iowa Senate

References

07